Triemli Hospital, also known in German as Stadtspital Triemli or Triemlispital, is a major hospital in the Swiss city of Zürich. The hospital is located in the western suburbs of the city, in the Friesenberg quarter and the Wiedikon district.

Triemli Hospital is a municipal central hospital owned and run by the city of Zürich. It offers its services to patients with all classes of medical insurance. Besides accepting patients from within the city, as a central hospital it also accepts patients forwarded from neighbouring hospitals in the cantons of Glarus, Grisons, Schaffhausen, Schwyz, Uri, Zug and Zürich.

Transportation 

The Zürich Triemli railway station, on line S10 of the Zürich S-Bahn, is situated immediately to the south of the hospital site. The Triemli terminus of routes 9 and 14 of the Zurich tram system is situated on the northern side of the hospital site. Both stops have direct pedestrian access to the hospital.

Infrastructure 

The Triemli Hospital has a 550-bed facility.

References

External links 

 
 Official web site of the Stadtspital Triemli (English subset)
 Official web site of the Stadtspital Triemli (German)

Healthcare in Zürich
Hospitals in Switzerland
Municipal hospitals